Aşağıtarlacık is a village in the Mazgirt District, Tunceli Province, Turkey. The village is populated by Kurds of the Suran and Xiran tribes and of non-tribal affiliation. It had a population of 47 in 2021.

The hamlet of Yukarıtarlacık is attached to the village.

References 

Villages in Mazgirt District
Kurdish settlements in Tunceli Province